Leslie Charlotte Benenson, R.E. (13 January 1941 - 18 February 2018) was an English artist who worked in a variety of different mediums, including sculpture, oils, watercolours, ceramics and calligraphy.

Life and work 

Benenson was born in London, where she attended La Sagesse Convent High School, before studying art at the Regent Street Polytechnic (1958–63) under Geoffrey H. Deeley and James Osborne. She was awarded a National Diploma in Design in 1962.

In addition to her permanent studies, Benenson took private calligraphy tuition with Anthony Wood between 1963–64, after which she was elected a member to the Society of Scribes & Illuminators.

After successfully exhibiting work at the Royal Academy from 1962, and at the Royal Society of Painter-Etchers and Engravers from 1968, Benenson was elected to member status of the latter institution in 1978. Additionally, Benenson was one of the founder members of the Society of Equestrian Artists in 1979.

She is exhibited widely, and her work can be found in many public and private collections, including the Towner Art Gallery, Ashmolean, Hereford Museum and the International Exlibriscentrum.

Exhibitions

Solo
1971 - Rye Art Gallery
1971 - Michelham Priory
1975 - John Gage Gallery, Eastbourne
1976 - Michelham Priory

Group
1966 - Royal Academy, London
1967 - Royal Academy, London
1968 - Royal Society of Painter-Etchers and Engravers
1969 - Royal Academy, London
1970 - Royal Academy, London
1971 - Victoria & Albert Museum, London
1971 - Royal Academy, London
1972 - Royal Academy, London
1979 - Victoria & Albert Museum, London
1980 - Linz, Austria
1981 - Sint-Niklaas, Antwerp, Belgium
1981 - Biala Podlaska, Poland

References 

1941 births
Living people
21st-century British women artists
Alumni of the University of Westminster
Artists from London
British calligraphers
English women painters
Landscape artists
Women calligraphers
21st-century English women
21st-century English people